Panayannarkavu is a small village In Thiruvalla Sub-District on Parumala Island in the Pamba River in Thiruvalla taluk of Pathanamthitta district in Kerala, India. The village is known for the presence of the Parumala Valiya Panayannarkavu Devi Temple,
of which Saptha matha (Seven Goddess) is the presiding power. There is also a temple of Siva on the premises. Until recently, esoteric tantric rituals were conducted in this Saktheya temple.

See also
 Parumala Valiya Panayannarkavu Devi Temple
 Parumala
 Mannar

Sources

 https://www.templespedia.com/panayannarkavu-devi-kshethram/
 Parumala Valiya Panayannar Kavu
 Website on Panayannar Kavu Temple

References

Islands of Kerala
River islands of India
Villages in Thiruvalla taluk
Pamba River
Villages in Pathanamthitta district